Borrowed Time is a interactive fiction game about a detective, who tries to rescue his kidnapped wife. The game was developed by Interplay and published by Activision in 1985. Mastertronic republished it as a budget title under the name Time to Die.

Plot 
The plot in the style of a detective story of the noir crime genre is set in the USA of the 1930s. The player takes a role of a private detective, Sam Harlow. His ex-wife Rita Sweeney has been kidnapped, and he tries to free her. In the process, he is pursued by gangsters who are after his life.

Gameplay 

Borrowed Time is a text adventure with a complementary graphical user interface. Control is via the keyboard, alternatively, many commands and objects can be selected from a graphical menu with a joystick or a mouse. Moving around is done in the same way - a selection window with cardinal directions is available. The player must interrogate suspects and collect evidence at the various locations in order to achieve the game goal. Some game actions have a time limit for problem-solving.

Development 
Borrowed Time was produced by Interplay for Activision and was part of a $100,000 contract that included a total of three adventure games. Interplay founder Fargo already had experience in the adventure genre: his first game was the adventure The Demon's Forge, released for Apple II in 1981. The parser used by Interplay was developed by Fargo and a collaborator, and at one stage of development had a dictionary of 250 nouns, 200 verbs, and could evaluate input with prepositions and indirect objects. The same engine had been used in the previous games Mindshadow and The Tracer Sanction. The writing and much of the game design were done by Subway Software, a company founded by game journalist Bill Kunkel specifically for Borrowed Time. Fargo outsourced the writing because he felt that no one at Interplay could produce quality prose.

Reception 
Info rated Borrowed Time four stars out of five, describing it as "a big step forward in the realm of 'interactive entertainment' ... a tonic to jaded adventurers", and praising the game's graphics, parser, and humor. Compute! wrote that "Activision has created a delightful game environment with the look and feel of those classic hardboiled detective movies and novels". Computer Gaming Worlds Charles Ardai called Borrowed Time "a superbly cinematic graphic adventure" that was too brief and deserved a sequel. A German reviewer recognized the challenging storyline, the detailed graphics and the comfortable gameplay. He gave Borrowed Time 82 out of 100.

References

External links 
 
 

1980s interactive fiction
1985 video games
Activision games
Amiga games
Apple II games
Atari ST games
Classic Mac OS games
Commodore 64 games
Detective video games
Interplay Entertainment games
Video games set in the United States
Video games set in the 1930s
Mastertronic games
Video games developed in the United States